IQ imbalance is a performance-limiting issue in the design of a class of radio receivers known as direct conversion receivers. These translate the received radio frequency (RF, or pass-band) signal directly from the carrier frequency  to baseband using a single mixing stage.

However, in the analog domain, the phase difference is never exactly 90°. Neither is the gain perfectly matched between the parallel sections of circuitry dealing with the two signal paths.

IQ imbalance results from these two imperfections, and is one of the two major drawbacks of direct-conversion receivers compared to traditional superheterodyne receivers. (The other is DC offset.) Their design must include measures to 
control IQ imbalance, so as to limit errors in the demodulated signal.

Definition 
A direct-conversion receiver uses two quadrature sinusoidal signals to perform the so-called quadrature down-conversion. This process requires shifting the LO signal by 90° to produce a quadrature sinusoidal component, and a matched pair of mixers converting the same input signal with the two versions of the LO. Mismatches between the two LO signals and/or along the two branches of down-conversion mixers, and any following amplifiers, and low-pass filters, cause the quadrature baseband signals to be corrupted, either due to amplitude or phase differences. Suppose the received pass-band signal is identical to the transmitted signal and is given by:where  is the transmitted base-band signal. Assume that the gain error is dB and the phase error is  degrees. In an OFDM system, the base-band signal consists of several sub-carriers. Complex-conjugating the base-band signal of the kth sub-carrier carrying data  is identical to carrying  on the th sub-carrier:where  is the sub-carrier spacing. Equivalently, the received base-band OFDM signal under the IQ imbalance effect is given by:In conclusion, besides a complex gain imposed on the current sub-carrier data , IQ imbalance also introduces Inter Carrier Interference (ICI) from the adjacent carrier or sub-carrier. The ICI term makes OFDM receivers very sensitive to IQ imbalances. To solve this problem, the designer can request a stringent specification of the matching of the two branches in the frond-end or compensate for the imbalance in the base-band receiver. On the other hand, a digital Odd-Order I/Q-demodulator with only one input can be used, but such design has a bandwidth limitation.

Simulation 
IQ imbalance can be simulated by computing the gain and phase imbalance and applying them to the base-band signal by means of several real multipliers and adders.

Synchronization errors 
The time domain base-band signals with IQ imbalance can be represented by :Note that  and  can be assumed to be time-invariant and frequency-invariant, meaning that they are constant over several sub carriers and symbols. Transforming to the frequency domain, we have the frequency domain OFDM signals under the influence of IQ imbalance given by:Note that the second term represents interference coming from the mirrored sub-carrier

IQ imbalance estimation in MIMO-OFDM systems 
In MIMO-OFDM systems, each RF channel has its own down-converting circuit. Therefore, the IQ imbalance for each RF channel is independent of those for the other RF channels. Therefore, we take the first RF channel as an example. The received signals at the pilot sub-carriers of the first RF channel are stacked into a vector , 

, where  is the  matrix defined by:Clearly, the above formula is similar to that of the SISO case and can be solved using the LS method. Moreover, the estimation complexity can be reduced by using fewer pilot sub-carriers in the estimation.

IQ imbalance compensation 
The IQ imbalance can be compensated in either the time domain or the frequency domain. In the time domain, the compensated signal  in the current mth sample point is given by:We can see that, by using the ratio  to mitigate the IQ imbalance, there is a loss factor . When the noise is added before the IQ imbalance, the SNR remains the same, because both noise and signal suffer this loss. However, if the noise is added after IQ imbalance, the effective SNR degrades. Compared with the time domain approach, compensating in the frequency domain is more complicated because the mirrored sub-carrier is needed. The frequency domain compensated signal at the ith symbol and the kth sub-carrier:Nevertheless, in reality, the time domain compensation is less preferred because it introduces larger latency between IQ imbalance estimation and compensation.

IQ imbalance estimation 
In the second half, the sub-carriers from -1 to -N/2 are used for pilot transmission. Such a training scheme easily decouples the IQ imbalance and the channel frequency response.

The second half of the training sequence can be used in a similar way. Furthermore, the accuracy of this ratio estimation can be improved by averaging over several training symbols and several sub-carriers. Although the IQ imbalance estimation using this training symbol is simple, this method suffers from low spectrum efficiency, as quite a few OFDM symbols must be reserved for training. Note that, when the thermal noise is added before the IQ imbalance, the ratio  is sufficient to compensate the IQ imbalance. However, when the noise is added after the IQ imbalance, compensation using only  can degrade the ensuing demodulation performance.

Notes

References

Further reading 
 M. Valkama, M. Renfors, and V. Koivunen, 2001. "Advanced methods for I/Q imbalance compensation in communication receivers," IEEE Transactions on Signal Processing, 49, 2335-2344
 J. Tubbax, B. Come, L. V. der Perre, S. Donnay, M. Engels, H. D. Man, and M. Moonen, 2005. " Compensation of IQ imbalance and phase noise in OFDM systems," IEEE Transactions on Wireless Communications, 4, 872-877.
 T.D Chiueh, PY Tsai, IW L, "Baseband Receiver Design for Wireless MIMO_OFDM Communications 2nd"
 Slyusar, V. I., Soloshchev, O. N., Titov, I. V.  A method for correction of quadrature disbalance of reception channels in a digital antenna array// Radioelectronics and Communications Systems. – 2004, VOL 47; PART 2, pages 30 - 35. 

Radio electronics